Dozaville is an unincorporated community in Randolph County, Illinois, United States. Dozaville is located in Kaskaskia Precinct, which (exceptionally for Illinois) is west of the Mississippi River.

Dozaville was laid out in 1872 by William Doza, and named for him.

References

Unincorporated communities in Randolph County, Illinois
Unincorporated communities in Illinois